Nationality words link to articles with information on the nation's poetry or literature (for instance, Irish or France).

Events

Works published

Great Britain
 Anonymous, The Buik of Alexander, publication year uncertain, written in Middle Scots in 1438; erroneously attributed to John Barbour, a close translation of two French original works from the Middle Ages
 George Buchanan, Paraphrasis psalmorum Davidis, in Latin
 Thomas Churchyard, A Pleasaunte Laborinth Called Churchyardes Chance
 Humphrey Gifford, A Poste of Gilloflowrs, prose and poetry; Part 1 translated from Italian and French; Part 2 in verse
 Anthony Munday, The Paine of Pleasure

Other
 Fernando de Herrera, Anotaciones, criticism, Spain
 Philippe Desportes, an edition of his works; France
 Jan Kochanowski, Laments (Treny) ("Thredonies"), Poland
 Torquato Tasso, Jerusalem Delivered (La Gerusalemme liberata), 14 cantos in pirated edition, Italy

Births
 April 18 – Thomas Middleton, English (died 1627) English playwright and poet
 June 9 – Daniël Heinsius (died 1655), Dutch scholar writing Latin and Dutch poetry
 September 14 – Francisco de Quevedo (died 1645), nobleman, politician and one of the most prominent Spanish poets of the age
 October 12 – Hortensio Félix Paravicino (died 1633), Spanish preacher and poet
 November 9 – Johannes Narssius (died 1637), Dutch-born New Latin poet, physician and Remonstrant minister
 Also:
 Brian Mac Giolla Phádraig (died 1652), Irish Gaelic scholar and poet
 Thomas Ford (died 1648), English composer, lutenist, viol player and poet
 Francisco Rodrigues Lobo (died 1621), Portuguese poet and bucolic writer
 Daniel Pribiš (died 1645), Slovak
 Francisco Rodrigues Lobo, born about this year (died 1622), Portuguese
 John Webster (died 1634), English Jacobean dramatist and poet

Deaths
 June 10 – Luís de Camões, sometimes rendered in English as "Luis de Camoens", died (born about 1524), perhaps the most highly regarded Portuguese poet
 June 22 – Hernando de Acuna died (born c. 1520), Spanish
 Also:
 Shlomo Halevi Alkabetz (born 1500), Greek kabbalist and poet
 Wu Cheng'en died 1580 or 1582 (born 1500 or 1505), Chinese novelist and poet of the Ming Dynasty
 Robin Clidro (born 1545), Welsh language poet and itinerant poet
 Sebastián de Horozco (born 1510), Spanish poet and playwright
 Thomas Tusser (born 1524), English

See also

 Poetry
 16th century in poetry
 16th century in literature
 Dutch Renaissance and Golden Age literature
 Elizabethan literature
 French Renaissance literature
 Renaissance literature
 Spanish Renaissance literature
 University Wits

Notes

16th-century poetry
Poetry